Želino is a village and seat of the municipality of Želino, North Macedonia.

History

According to the 1467-68 Ottoman defter, Želino appears as being largely inhabited by an Orthodox Christian Albanian population. Due to Slavicisation, some families had a mixed Slav-Albanian anthroponomy - usually a Slavic first name and an Albanian last name or last names with Albanian patronyms and Slavic suffixes. 

The names are: Progon siromah (poor); Nela, his son; Hamza, son of Hrança; Dimitri, son of Hrança; Nikolla, son of Progon; Dabzhiv, son of Progon; Miladin, son of Progon.

Demographics
As of the 2021 census, Želino had 3,432 residents with the following ethnic composition:
Albanians 3,340
Persons for whom data are taken from administrative sources 91
Others 1

According to the 2002 census, the village had a total of 4,110 inhabitants.  Ethnic groups in the village include 4100 Albanians, one Bosniak, and nine others.

Sports
Local football club KF Liria play in the OFS Tetovo league.

References

External links

Villages in Želino Municipality
Albanian communities in North Macedonia